Isaac Bruce Hildebrand (May 27, 1927 – August 27, 2006) was a Canadian ice hockey and lacrosse player. Born in Winnipeg, Manitoba, he played for the Chicago Black Hawks and the New York Rangers of the `original six' NHL teams 1949–1953.

In 1985, he was inducted into Canada's Sports Hall of Fame for the sport of lacrosse. He was inducted into Canada's Lacrosse Hall of Fame in 1972 and Canada's Sports Hall of Fame in 1985 as well as Sports Halls of Fame in Peterborough (1978), Belleville (1989) and Oshawa (1993).

Ike excelled at both of Canada's national sports, lacrosse and hockey. He played lacrosse with the New Westminster Salmonbellies Senior team and at age 17 won the MVP award in the Mann Cup Canadian Championship. In a lacrosse career that spanned 17 years (1943–1960) he was honored 13 times as an all-star. After a junior ice hockey career with the Oshawa Generals, he spent 10 years playing professional hockey with minor pro teams in the Pacific Coast League, the US Hockey League, the Quebec Pro League and the American Hockey League.

Hildebrand also played with the New York Rangers, and the Chicago Black Hawks of the `original six' NHL teams 1949–1953. He was playing coach with the Belleville McFarlands and scored the winning goal when they won the World Championship for Canada in Prague Czechoslovakia in 1959.

After his playing days, Hildebrand turned to coaching with the London Nationals, Orillia Terriers and two years with the Oshawa Generals.

He died in St. Albert, Alberta in 2006.

References

External links

1927 births
2006 deaths
Canada men's national ice hockey team coaches
Canadian ice hockey coaches
Canadian ice hockey forwards
Canadian lacrosse players
Canadian people of Norwegian descent
Chicago Blackhawks players
Ice hockey people from Winnipeg
New York Rangers players
Oshawa Generals coaches
Oshawa Generals players
Toronto Marlboros players